Cabana de Bergantiños or Cabana is a municipality in the Province of A Coruña, in the autonomous community of Galicia in northwestern Spain. It used to be known as Cesullas.

Main sights 

 Castro de Borneiro: an Iron Age hillfort.
 Dolmen of Dombate: a dolmen of the Neolithic.
 Torre da Penela: tower of an ancient castle.

Demography 
From: INE Archiv

References

Municipalities in the Province of A Coruña